The Blissidae are a family in the Hemiptera (true bugs), comprising nearly 50 genera and 400 species. The group has often been treated as a subfamily of the Lygaeidae but was resurrected as a full family by Thomas Henry (1997).

The adult insects are elongate, typically four times as long as broad, and in some species, up to seven times. Short wings are common in many species.

All the species feed on the sap  of plants, mostly grasses, and most of the species live between the sheaths of leaves. The most economically important species is the true chinch bug, Blissus leucopterus, a destructive pest of corn crops in the United States.

List of genera
These 54 genera of the family Blissidae are listed in the Lygaeoidea Species File:

 Aradacrates Slater & Wilcox, 1969
 Aradademus Slater, 1967
 Archaeodemus Slater, 1986
 Atrademus Slater, 1967
 Aulacoblissus Slater, 1986
 Australodemus Slater & Sweet, 1963
 Barademus Slater, 1967
 Barrerablissus Brailovsky, 2015
 Blissiella Slater, 1967
 Blissus Burmeister, 1835 (chinch bugs)
 Bochrus Stal, 1861
 Capodemus Slater & Sweet, 1972
 Cavelerius Distant, 1903
 Caveloblissus Slater & Wilcox, 1968
 Chelochirus Spinola, 1839
 Dentisblissus Slater, 1961
 Dimorphopterus Stal, 1872
 Extarademus Slater & Wilcox, 1966
 Extaramorphus Slater, Ashlock & Wilcox, 1969
 Gelastoblissus Slater & Wilcox, 1969
 Hasanobochrus Ghauri, 1982
 Heinsius Distant, 1901
 Heteroblissus Barber, 1954
 Howdenoblissus Stys, 1991
 Iphicrates Distant, 1904
 Ischnocoridea Horvath, 1892
 Ischnodemus Fieber, 1837
 Lemuriblissus Slater, 1967
 Lucerocoris Slater, 1968
 Macchiademus Slater & Wilcox, 1973
 Macropes Motschulsky, 1859
 Merinademus Slater, 1967
 Micaredemus Slater, 1967
 Napoblissus Brailovsky & Barrera, 2012
 Patritiodemus Slater & Ahmad, 1971
 Patritius Distant, 1901
 Pirkimerus Distant, 1904
 Praeblissus Barber, 1949
 Praetorblissus Slater, 1966
 Procellademus Slater & Wilcox, 1966
 Propinquidemus Slater, 1986
 Pseudoblissus Slater, 1979
 Ramadademus Slater, 1967
 Reticulatodemus Slater & Wilcox, 1966
 Riggiella Kormilev, 1949
 Scansidemus Slater & Wilcox, 1969
 Scintillademus Slater, 1968
 Slaterellus Drake & Davis, 1959
 Spalacocoris Stal, 1874
 Talpoblissus Slater & Wilcox, 1973
 Toonglasa Distant, 1893
 Tympanoblissus Dellapé & Minghetti, 2020
 Wheelerodemus Henry & Sweet, 2015
 Xenoblissus Barber, 1954

References

 
Heteroptera families